The 1993 Major League Baseball season was the final season of two-division play in each league, before the Central Division was added the following season, giving both the NL and AL three divisions each.

Sixteen years after the American League expanded from 12 to 14 teams, the National League finally followed suit, with the Colorado Rockies and the Florida Marlins (now the Miami Marlins) joining the NL.  It was also the first season since 1976 that both leagues had the same number of teams. The Toronto Blue Jays capped off the season by winning their second consecutive World Series title, beating the Philadelphia Phillies in six games. The World Series was clinched when, in one of the most famous moments in baseball, Joe Carter hit a three-run walk-off home run in the 9th to seal the victory at home.

Awards and honors
Baseball Hall of Fame
Reggie Jackson

Other awards
Outstanding Designated Hitter Award: Paul Molitor (TOR)
Roberto Clemente Award (Humanitarian):  Barry Larkin (CIN).
Rolaids Relief Man Award: Jeff Montgomery (KC, American); Randy Myers (CHC, National).

Player of the Month

Pitcher of the Month

Statistical leaders

Standings

American League

National League

Postseason

Bracket

Managers

American League

National League

Home Field Attendance & Payroll

Television coverage

Events
 April 8 – Carlos Baerga of the Cleveland Indians becomes the first player to hit a home run from both sides of the plate in the same inning.
 Oct 3 – George Brett plays his final game in his career, against the Texas Rangers. He ended his career by singling in his final at-bat.

References

External links
1993 Major League Baseball season schedule at Baseball Reference

 
Major League Baseball seasons